Events in the year 2023 in Kenya.

Incumbents
President: William Ruto
Deputy President: Rigathi Gachagua
Chief Justice: Martha Koome

Events

Sports
Ongoing – 2022–23 Kenyan Premier League

Deaths
6 January - Edwin Chiloba, Fashion designer, Model, And LGBTQ Activist, (born 1998).
24 January – George Magoha, surgeon, (born 1952).

References

 
Kenya
Kenya
2020s in Kenya
Years of the 21st century in Kenya